Kashif Ghafoor, better known by his professional name "Iceman Nick", is a jeweler and jewelry designer based in Houston, Texas. He created a $400,000 Cuban link necklace for Errol Spence Jr. and a diamond-covered watch for Flo Rida. He has also previously created jewelry for LeBron James, Deshaun Watson, Megan Thee Stallion, and JaVale McGee.

Early life and career 
Nick was born and graduated secondary school in Pakistan. After immigrating to the United States in 2000, he met Houston jeweler "King Johnny" at a flea market; the pair later became business partners at Johnny's Custom Jewelry.

References 

Jewellery designers
Living people
Pakistani emigrants to the United States
Year of birth missing (living people)